Darko Bjelanović (born 25 July 1991) is a Serbian football defender who plays for FAP.

Career
He has started in Zlatar Nova Varoš, then, he left to Pobeda Beloševac and after three seasons, he moved to Radnički Kragujevac.

Radnički Kragujevac
He made his debut for Radnički in Jelen SuperLiga away match versus Napredak Kruševac on 1 March 2014.

References

External links
 
 Stats at utakmica.rs

1991 births
Living people
Sportspeople from Užice
Association football defenders
Serbian footballers
FK Radnički 1923 players
FK FAP players
Serbian SuperLiga players